was a town located in Hikami District, Hyōgo Prefecture, Japan.

As of 2003, the town had an estimated population of 12,099 and a density of 159.96 persons per km². The total area was 75.64 km².

On November 1, 2004, Kasuga, along with the towns of Hikami, Aogaki, Ichijima, Kaibara and Sannan (all from Hikami District), was merged to create the city of Tamba and no longer exists as an independent municipality.

External links
 Official website of Tamba in Japanese

Dissolved municipalities of Hyōgo Prefecture
Tamba, Hyōgo